Warren Phillips may refer to:
Warren G. Phillips (born 1954), American schoolteacher
Warren H. Phillips (born 1926), American journalist